Phoebe Panaretos (born 1989/1990) is an Australian actress and singer, notable for roles in musical theatre in Australia.

Early life 
Panaretos studied drama at Sydney's Newtown High School of the Performing Arts in 2008.

Career 
She played the lead role of Fran in the stage musical Strictly Ballroom from 2014, Connie Francis in Dream Lover: The Bobby Darin Musical in 2016, and Whatshername in the Australian production of Green Day's American Idiot in 2017.

References

External links 
 
 

Living people
Australian musical theatre actresses
Year of birth missing (living people)